Alexander Stewart Fitzpatrick (born December 22, 1944) is a Scottish-born Canadian former professional ice hockey player who played 22 games in the National Hockey League.  He played with the New York Rangers and Minnesota North Stars. He was born in Paisley, Scotland, United Kingdom and raised in Dundas, Ontario.

See also
List of National Hockey League players from the United Kingdom

References 

1944 births
Living people
Canadian ice hockey centres
Guelph Royals players
Minnesota North Stars players
New York Rangers players
Sportspeople from Paisley, Renfrewshire
Ice hockey people from Toronto